Filip Jarota (born 15 June 2001 in Szczecin) is a Polish professional squash player. As of July 2021, he was ranked number 222 in the world.

References

2001 births
Living people
Polish male squash players
Sportspeople from Szczecin
21st-century Polish people
Competitors at the 2022 World Games